A prone pilot lies on their stomach rather than seated in a normal upright or reclining position.

During the 1930s, glider designer Reimar Horten began developing a prone position for his flying wing gliders. However it proved uncomfortable and he later settled on a semi-prone arrangement with the knees somewhat lowered.

During World War II it was suggested that a pilot in the prone position might be more effective in some kinds of high-speed aircraft, because it would permit the pilot to withstand a greater g-force in the upward and downward direction with respect to the plane. The fuselage could also be made shallower and therefore have reduced weight and drag. Many speculative designs of the late-war and early postwar periods featured this arrangement, and several prototypes were built or converted to test the idea. However testing revealed difficulties in maintaining a head-up attitude to see forward and in operating some controls. These problems outweighed the advantages and the position was never adopted for high-speed flight. 

Many modern hang gliders, developed since the 1960s, typically offer a prone pilot position during flight, with the pilot lowering their legs and standing upright only when taking off or landing.

List of aircraft with prone pilots
Many hang gliders since the 1960s have allowed the pilot to lie prone in flight. These are not included here.

|-
| Akaflieg Berlin B9 || Germany ||  ||  ||  ||  ||  || 
|-
| Akaflieg Stuttgart fs17 || Germany ||  ||  ||  ||  ||  || 
|-
| Armstrong Whitworth AW.171 || UK || Supersonic || Experimental || 1957 || Project || 0 || Never ordered.
|-
| Beecraft Wee Bee || USA || Tractor || Private || 1948 || Prototype || 1 || 
|-
| Blohm & Voss BV 40 ||  Germany||  ||  ||  ||  ||  || 
|-
| DFS 228 || Germany ||  ||  ||  ||  ||  || 
|-
| DFS Liege-Kranich || Germany ||  ||  ||  ||  ||  || 
|-
| Farrar V-1 Flying Wing || USA ||  ||  ||  ||  ||  || 
|-
| FMA I.Ae. 37 || Argentina ||  ||  ||  ||  ||  || 
|-
| Gloster Meteor F8 "Prone Pilot" || UK || Jet || Experimental || 1954 || Prototype || 1 || Conversion of standard aircraft
|-
| Guerchais-Roche Émouchet || France ||  ||  ||  ||  ||  || 
|-
| Henschel Hs 132 || Germany ||  ||  ||  ||  ||  || 
|-
| Horten H.III || Germany || Glider ||  ||  ||  ||  || 
|-
| Horten H.IV  || Germany || Glider ||  ||  ||  ||  || 
|-
| Horten H.VI || Germany || Glider ||  ||  ||  ||  || 
|-
| Ikarus 232 Pionr || Yugoslavia ||  ||  ||  ||  || 1 || 
|-
| Ikarus S-451 || Yugoslavia || Tractor || Experimental || 1952 || Prototype || 1 || Enlarged 232. First 451 built.
|-
| Lamson PL-1 Quark || USA ||  ||  ||  ||  ||  || 
|-
| Northrop XP-79 || USA || Jet || Fighter || 1945 || Prototype || 1 || Flying wing
|-
| Reid and Sigrist R.S.3 Desford || UK ||  ||  ||  ||  ||  || 
|-
| Savoia-Marchetti SM.93 || Italy ||  ||  ||  ||  ||  || 
|-
| Wright Flyer || USA || Pusher || Experimental || 1903 || Prototype || 1 || 
|-
| Wright Flyer II || USA || Pusher || Experimental || 1904 || Prototype || 1 || 
|-
| Wright Flyer III || USA || Pusher || Experimental || 1905 || Prototype || 1 || Photos also show the pilot sitting up.
|}

Bibliography 
Prizeman, R.; "Getting down to it", Flight, 1953, pp.584 ff. (First page: Internet Archive).

 
Lists of aircraft by design configuration